Maggy may refer to:

Given name
 Maggy (model) (born 1992), Canadian-Japanese model
 Maggy Ashmawy (born 1992), Egyptian sport shooter
 Maggy Breittmayer (1888–1961), Swiss violinist
 Maggy de Coster (born 1962), French writer
 Maggy Hurchalla (born 1940), American environmental activist
 Maggy Nagel (born 1957), Luxembourgish politician
 Maggy Rouff (1896-1971), French fashion designer
 Maggy Wauters (born 1953), Belgian athlete
 Maggy Whitehouse (born 1956), British priest

Surname
 Shinji Maggy (born 1973), Japanese comedian

Fictional characters
 Maggy Moulach, a creature in Scottish folklore
 Maggy (Monica's Gang), Brazilian comic book character, created by Mauricio de Souza

See also
 Maggie (disambiguation)